Jasmine Moore (born May 1, 2001) is an American athlete. In 2022, she became the first American woman to qualify for the World Athletics Championships in both the long jump and the triple jump.

From Grand Prairie, Texas and a student at the University of Georgia, she said she chose Georgia in order to train with Petros Kyprianou, and that she was inspired by the success of Keturah Orji. Moore was named the 2019 Gatorade Girls Track & Field Athlete of the Year.

Her personal best long jump was  recorded in Athens, Georgia on the April 9, 2021, the distance hit the qualifying standard for the Olympic Games and was the sixth highest in the world for the year, and in the top 10 collegiate distances of all time. At the US Olympic Trials she finished third in the triple jump to clinch her first Olympic place at the 2020 Summer Games.

Career
Jasmine Moore qualified for 4 Team USA Track and Field championships.

NCAA
Jasmine Moore is a 6-time NCAA Division 1 champion, North American triple jump record, NCAA Triple Jump Record, NCAA indoor Long Jump Record, collegiate indoor Triple Jump record holder, 12-time NCAA Division 1 All-American jumper & 9-time Southeastern Conference Champion.

Prep
Jasmine Moore is from Grand Prairie, Texas, a Lake Ridge High School alumnus and a  former student at the University of Georgia,

Moore is a 9-time Texas state UIL champion.
Moore is a 2019 Texas state University Interscholastic League champion in the triple jump , long jump . Moore is a 2018 Texas state University Interscholastic League champion in the triple jump , long jump , 4x200 m in 1:37.11, and 2nd place 4x100 m in 46.30. Moore is a 2017 Texas state University Interscholastic League champion in the triple jump , long jump , 4th place in 4x400 m in 3:51.80, and 2nd place 4x100 m in 45.55. Moore is a 2016 Texas state University Interscholastic League champion in the triple jump , long jump , and 4th place in 4x400 m in 3:51.44.

References

External links
 Georgia Bulldogs bio
 Florida Gators bio
 

2001 births
Living people
American female long jumpers
American female triple jumpers
Georgia Lady Bulldogs track and field athletes
Florida Gators women's track and field athletes
People from Grand Prairie, Texas
Sportspeople from the Dallas–Fort Worth metroplex
Sportspeople from Arlington, Texas
Sportspeople from Texas
Track and field athletes from Georgia (U.S. state)
Track and field athletes from Florida
African-American track and field athletes
Athletes (track and field) at the 2020 Summer Olympics
Olympic track and field athletes of the United States
21st-century African-American people
21st-century African-American women